The General Principles of the Civil Law of the People's Republic of China is a law in the PRC that was promulgated on April 12, 1986 and came into force on January 1, 1987. It is heavily influenced by the German Civil Code. It is the main source of civil law in the PRC and seeks to provide a uniform framework for interpreting the PRC's civil laws. 

Unlike most civil law jurisdictions, the PRC didn't not have a comprehensive civil code until 2021, and attempts to create one by the Chinese government have been difficult and controversial. The "General Principles" include both civil rights and liabilities under civil law, and contains 9 chapters and 156 articles. The chapters deal with the following topics:

 Basic Principles
 Citizen (Natural Person)
 Legal Persons
 Civil Juristic Acts and Agency
 Civil Rights
 Civil Liability
 Limitation of Action
 Application of Law in Civil Relations with Foreigners
 Supplementary Provisions

See also 
 Civil Code of People's Republic of China, passed on May 28, 2020, effective Jan. 1, 2021.

References 

Laws of China